The Bryand Brand House is a historic plantation house on the east side of Alabama State Route 14 near Marion, Perry County, Alabama.  The two-story Greek Revival style house was built in 1845.  Unique features of the interior are the treatment of the wide central hall as a quasi-dogtrot, the double-leaf front door, and the original rabbeted sheathing found on all of the
ceilings and on the walls of the central halls.  The house was moved to its current site in 1978 to save it from destruction.   It was added to the National Register of Historic Places on June 22, 2010.

References

National Register of Historic Places in Perry County, Alabama
Houses in Perry County, Alabama
Houses on the National Register of Historic Places in Alabama
Greek Revival houses in Alabama
Plantation houses in Alabama
Houses completed in 1845